Omphalotropis tumidula is a species of minute, salt marsh snail with an operculum, aquatic gastropod mollusks, or micromollusks, in the family Assimineidae. This species is endemic to Micronesia.

References
 

Fauna of Micronesia
Omphalotropis
Assimineidae
Taxonomy articles created by Polbot